Nytorv (English: New Square or New Market) is a public square in the centre of Copenhagen, Denmark. Together with the adjoining Gammeltorv it forms a common space, today part of the Strøget pedestrian zone. The square is dominated by the imposing Neoclassical façade of the Copenhagen Court House, which from 1815-1905 also served as the City Hall.

History

The new market
Nytorv was created by Christian IV in 1610 when he cleared an area behind the City Hall in connection with his adaptation of the building in a Renaissance style. Nytorv thrived as a marketplace, as did Gammeltorv, which was located on the other side of the city hall. It was at Nytorv that the butchers carried out their work, while most of the sales took place at Gammeltorv.

The city's scaffold

Nytorv also became the location of the city's scaffold and a pillory. Pillories were also found at a number of other sites around the city. A permanent scaffold was not constructed until 1627, and in 1728, when the City Hall was rebuilt after the Copenhagen Fire of 1728, an octagonal masonry podium was built.

Between 1728 and 1740, Ludvig Holberg lived in a house on the corner of Gammeltorv and Nygade, on the border between the two squares. In an epigram, originally in Latin, he commented on the dual nature of the site, between posh Gammeltorv, with the Caritas Well (the 'ancient arts'), and Nytorv with its sinister execution facilities:

The last executions to be carried out at the scaffold behind the City Hall took place in 1758 when Frederik Hammond, the owner of an iron works in Norway, and his assistant, a Swede named Anders Sundblad, were convicted of producing counterfeit securities for an amount of 35,000 rigsdaler and beheaded. Three years later the scaffold was removed and from then executions only took place at Østerfælled, Vesterfælled and Amagerfælled, though branding and whipping continued at the Nytorv pillory until 1780.

Merger with Gammeltorv

In the Copenhagen Fire of 1795 the City Hall burnt down once again. This time it was not rebuilt at the same site, but moved to a larger lot on Nytorv's western side. Since 1728, it had been the location of the Royal Orphanage but this too was lost in the fire and was moved to other locations around the city.

The new building, which was to serve both as a City Hall and a courthouse, was designed by Christian Frederik Hansen, the leading Danish architect of the time. Completed in 1815, the project also included a jailhouse next door, connected to the courthouse by an arch with a passageway.

After the fire, Nytorv and Gammeltorv made up one common space. During the first half of the 20th century, the market activities gradually disappeared from the square which instead became increasingly dominated by cars. This changed in 1962 when the Strøget pedestrian zone was laid out.

Buildings

The square is dominated by the large courthouse with its ionic order columns, which occupies most of its west side. A skyway on each side of the courthouse connects it to the neighbouring buildings. The one to the left, on the other side of Slutterigade, is the former jailhouse. The skyway was used for transporting prisoners and has therefore been nicknamed the Bridge of Sighs.

All the other buildings around the square, most by unknown architects and all listed, are Neoclassical townhouses which date from the time immediately after the Great Fire of 1795. No. 3, opposite the courthouse, on the corner of Strøget, has a facade decorated with pilasters and a triangular pediment. No. 5 which was built from 1799 to 1803 for Hartvig Frisch to designs by Nicolai Abildgaard originally also featured pilasters and pediment but was extended with an extra floor and adapted by August Klein in 1889–1890. 

The Jens Lauritzen House at No. 7 was built in 1795–96 for Jens Lauritzen, a grocer and brewer, possibly to designs by Andreas Kirk The elegant Jrup. No. 9 was built 1796–97 by an architect while No. 11, the large property on the corner of Brolæggerstræde, was designed by C. F. Hollander and completed one year later.

The three properties on the south side of the square were all built between 1795 and 1797 by unknown architects.

Nytorv today

Today Nytorv/Gammeltorv is a lively square in the heart of Copenhagen's old city. During the latest refurbishment of the square, conducted by city architect Otto Käszner in 1993, an octagonal podium was created at the site where the scaffold used to be and the footprint of the former city hall was marked in the paving with a paler stone. The podium now serves as a bench or occasionally as a bandstand, for instance during Copenhagen Jazz Festival.

The square is also home to one of the old telephone kiosks which are found in central locations throughout the city. The original model was designed by Fritz Kochs, but the one on Nytorv is a later model, somewhat larger and more heavy in its design, installed by Martin Jensen in 1913.

Cultural references
 Nytorv is used as a location at 1:15:37 and again at 1:15:54 in the first Olsen Gang film.
 In his poem Gennem byen sidste gang, a terminally ill Dan Turèll describes how he, on his last stroll through the city, just after passing Nytorv will be fading away.

References

External links

 Source

Squares in Copenhagen